The Tya is a river located in the municipality of Tydal in Trøndelag county, Norway. It is part of the Nea-Nidelvvassdraget river system.

See also
List of rivers in Norway

References

Tydal
Rivers of Trøndelag
Rivers of Norway